Ransbach-Baumbach is a town in the Westerwaldkreis in Rhineland-Palatinate, Germany. Ransbach-Baumbach is the seat of the Verbandsgemeinde of Ransbach-Baumbach, a kind of collective municipality.

Geography

The community lies in the Westerwald about 10 km northwest of Montabaur, and 15 km northeast of Koblenz.

History
In 1330, the parish of Ransbach had its first documentary mention. Already in 959, however, the Montabaurer Zehntbeschreibung (a “description of tithes”), speaks of the vanished community of Desper (Dedinsburg) near Ransbach. In 1373, the name Babenbach for Baumbach crops up. In 1969, Ransbach and Baumbach were merged into one community. In 1971, in the course of municipal restructuring, the Verbandsgemeinde of Ransbach-Baumbach was founded. In 1975, Ransbach-Baumbach was granted town rights.

Partnerships
 Pleurtuit, Brittany, France since 1985
 Parish of Rukoma in Mirenge, Rwanda since April 2005

Schools and kindergartens
 Astrid Lindgren-Schule (primary school/whole-day school)
 Erich Kästner-Schule (Regionalschule)
 St. Markus Catholic Kindergarten
 St. Antonius Catholic Kindergarten
 St. Martin Town Kindergarten

Sightseeing
Ransbach-Baumbach lies in the heart of the Kannenbäckerland, a small region known for its ceramics industry.
Many pottery works in and around Ransbach-Baumbach
40-m-high lookout tower on the Köppel
Yearly pottery market on the first weekend in October
Erlenhofsee (lake)

Other
Since 1676 the Fohr Brewery has been in Ransbach-Baumbach.

References

Towns in Rhineland-Palatinate
Westerwaldkreis